Carex oligocarpa, common name richwoods sedge, eastern few-fruited sedge, few-fruit sedge, and few-fruited sedge is a Carex species that is native to North America. It is a perennial.

Conservation status in the United States
It is endangered in New Jersey and Vermont, threatened in Michigan, and a species of special concern in Connecticut.

References

oligocarpa
Flora of North America